KAHR (96.7 FM) is a radio station broadcasting an Adult Hits format. It is licensed to Poplar Bluff, Missouri, United States.  The station is currently owned by Eagle Bluff Enterprises and features programming from ABC Radio.

History
The station went on the air as KXOQ on 16 January 1985. On 23 November 1987, it changed its call sign to the current KAHR.

References

External links

AHR
Radio stations established in 1985
1985 establishments in Missouri